Federal Baseball Club v. National League, 259 U.S. 200 (1922), is a case in which the U.S. Supreme Court ruled that the Sherman Antitrust Act did not apply to Major League Baseball.

Background
After the Federal League folded in 1915, most of the Federal League owners had been bought out by owners in the other major leagues, or had been compensated in other ways. For example, the owner of the St. Louis Terriers of the Federal League had been permitted to buy the St. Louis Browns of the American League. The owner of the Baltimore Terrapins had not been compensated, and sued the National League, the American League and other defendants, including several Federal League officials for conspiring to monopolize baseball by destroying the Federal League. In 1919, the defendants were found jointly liable, and damages of $80,000 assessed, which was tripled to $240,000 under the provisions of the Clayton Antitrust Act.

Judgment

Court of Appeals
The Court of Appeals reversed the trial verdict, and held that baseball was not subject to the Sherman Act. The case was appealed to the Supreme Court.

Supreme Court

In a unanimous decision written by Justice Oliver Wendell Holmes, the Court affirmed the Court of Appeals, holding that "the business is giving exhibitions of base ball, which are purely state affairs"; that is, that baseball was not interstate commerce for the purposes of the Sherman Act. Justice Holmes' decision was as follows:

Significance
This case is the main reason why MLB has not faced any competitor leagues since 1922, and MLB, to date, remains the only American sports league with such an antitrust exemption.

The case was reaffirmed in Toolson v. New York Yankees, Inc. 

In Flood v. Kuhn, the Court partially reversed, and found Major League Baseball to be engaged in interstate commerce. However, the justices refused to overturn baseball's original antitrust exemption from Federal Baseball, deeming it necessary to preserve precedent: in addition to Toolson, the case had already been heavily cited in Shubert, International Boxing, and Radovich.

In 2016's Direct Marketing Association v. Brohl, the 10th Circuit's Neil Gorsuch cited Federal Baseball and Toolson in his concurrence as one of the "precedential islands[, along with Bellas Hess, that] manage[s] to survive indefinitely even when surrounded by a sea of contrary law…. [that] would never expand but would, if anything,
wash away with the tides of time".

See also

 1922 in baseball
 Baseball law
 List of United States Supreme Court cases, volume 259

References

External links

 

History of Major League Baseball
United States Supreme Court cases
United States Supreme Court cases of the Taft Court
United States antitrust case law
Baseball law
Federal League
1922 in United States case law
Baltimore Terrapins
Major League Baseball litigation